Ormenaria is a genus of flatid planthoppers in the family Flatidae. There are at least two described species in Ormenaria.

Species
These two species belong to the genus Ormenaria:
 Ormenaria barberi (Van Duzee, 1912) c g b
 Ormenaria rufifascia (Walker, 1851) c g b (palm flatid planthopper)
Data sources: i = ITIS, c = Catalogue of Life, g = GBIF, b = Bugguide.net

References

Further reading

External links

 

Flatidae
Auchenorrhyncha genera